Lupfer Glacier is in Glacier National Park in the U.S. state of Montana. Between 1966 and 2005 Lupfer Glacier lost over 50 percent of its surface area.

See also
 List of glaciers in the United States
 Glaciers in Glacier National Park (U.S.)

References

Glaciers of Flathead County, Montana
Glaciers of Glacier National Park (U.S.)
Glaciers of Montana